Frederick William Daeche-Marshall (born 10 August 1991) is an English former first-class cricketer.

Daeche-Marshall was born at Enfield in August 1991. He was educated at Mill Hill School, before going up to Loughborough University. While studying at Loughborough, he made two appearances in first-class cricket for Loughborough MCCU against Nottinghamshire and Hampshire in 2012. He scored 36 runs in his two matches, with a high score of 32.

References

External links

1991 births
Living people
People from Enfield, London
People educated at Mill Hill School
Alumni of Loughborough University
English cricketers
Loughborough MCCU cricketers